The Committee of Safety, established by the Parliamentarians in July 1642, was the first of a number of successive committees set up to oversee the English Civil War against King Charles I, and the Interregnum.

1642–1644
The initial committee of safety consisted of five members of the House of Lords: the Earls of Essex, Holland, Northumberland and Pembroke and Viscount Saye-and-Sele, and ten members of the House of Commons: Nathaniel Fiennes, John Glynn, John Hampden, Denzil Holles, Henry Marten, Sir John Merrick, William Pierrepoint, John Pym, Sir Philip Stapleton, and Sir William Waller. It sat until 1644 when Parliament and their new Scottish allies agreed to replace it with the Committee of Both Kingdoms.

1647
The Presbyterians in the House of Commons set up a new committee of safety, to coordinate defence of London and Parliament from the New Model Army which was advancing on London with demands that the Presbyterians did not wish to meet. When it became clear that the populace did not support them, the committee was dissolved and the Presbyterians fled.

1659
There were two committees of safety in 1659. The first was set up on 7 May, on the authority of the Rump Parliament, to replace the Lord Protector Richard Cromwell's Council of State. It initially had seven members Charles Fleetwood, Sir Arthur Hesilrige, Sir Henry Vane the Younger, Edmund Ludlow, William Sydenham, Richard Salwey, and John Jones. Two days latter on 9 May four more men were appointed to the committee John Lambert, John Desborough, James Berry and Thomas Scot. It was only a temporary expediency and was dissolved two weeks later when on 19 May a new Council of State was appointed.

The last Committee of Safety was set up on 26 October 1659 by the high command of the New Model Army just before the Restoration. It was set up in response to the Rump Parliament which the day before tried to place the commander of the army Charles Fleetwood as chief of a military council under the authority of the speaker. The members of the last committee were:
 Henry Vane the Younger
 Bulstrode Whitelocke
 William Sydenham
 John Lambert
 James Berry 
 Lord Warriston (Archibald Johnston)
 Edmund Ludlow
 Richard Salwey
 John Desborough
 Charles Fleetwood
 Sir James Harrington
 William Steele
 Walter Strickland
 Henry Lawrence
 John Ireton
 Robert Tichborne
 Henry Brandrith
 Robert Thomson
 John Hewson
 John Clark (or John Clerk)
 Robert Lilburne
 Robert Bennet
 Cornelius Holland

Notes

References

English Civil War
Republicanism in England
1642 establishments in England